Thomasville, Georgia was home to several minor league baseball teams from 1913 to 1963, most of them in the Georgia–Florida League.

History

The Thomasville Hornets played from 1913 to 1915 in the Empire State League, Georgia–Florida League and Florida–Alabama–Georgia League.

Baseball did not return until the Thomasville Orioles arrived in 1935 in the Georgia–Florida League as an affiliate of the Baltimore Orioles of the International League. They became an independent team in 1940 as the Thomasville Tourists and then the Thomasville Lookouts in 1941.

After a shutdown for World War II, the team returned as a Detroit Tigers affiliate called the Thomasville Tigers, which played from 1946 to 1950.

The Americus Rebels moved to Thomasville for the 1952 season and were renamed as the Thomasville Tomcats.

They became a Brooklyn Dodgers affiliate and changed the team name to the Thomasville Dodgers in 1953. They continued in this manner until the league folded in 1958. The league returned in 1962 and so did the team, back with the Tigers for two more years.

The ballpark

Thomasville teams played at Varnedoe Field. Today, Vandedoe Stadium is the home of Thomas University baseball, located at
103 Varnedoe Road Thomasville, Georgia 31792.

Notable alumni

 Dale Alexander (1940); won 1932 AL batting title
 Bob Aspromonte (1957)
 Paul Foytack (1949)
 Frank Lary (1950); 3x MLB All-Star
 Frank Lucchesi (1952)
 Paul Minner (1941)
 Bubba Phillips (1949)
 Rich Reese (1962)
 Pete Reiser (1955), 3x MLB All-Star; won 1941 NL batting title

References

External links 
 Baseball Reference
 Chart of "Georgia–Florida League" teams

Thomas County, Georgia
Defunct minor league baseball teams
Los Angeles Dodgers minor league affiliates
Brooklyn Dodgers minor league affiliates
Detroit Tigers minor league affiliates
Washington Senators minor league affiliates
1913 establishments in Georgia (U.S. state)
1963 disestablishments in Georgia (U.S. state)
Baseball teams established in 1913
Sports clubs disestablished in 1963
Defunct baseball teams in Georgia
Baseball teams disestablished in 1963